Brickellia parryi is a Mexican species of flowering plants in the family Asteraceae. It is native to northeastern Mexico in the state of San Luis Potosí.

References

External links
Photo of herbarium specimen at Missouri Botanical Garden, collected in San Luis Potosí, isotype of Brickellia parryi

parryi
Flora of San Luis Potosí
Plants described in 1879